The ranks and insignia of the Confederate States were a rank insignia system devised for the Military of the Confederate States of America during the American Civil War.

Confederate States Army (CSAA)

Officers
At the beginning of the civil war the ranks and rank insignias for the fledgling Confederate States Army had to be developed while the volunteer forces of the individual states that formed the Confederacy made up their own ranks and insignias. They usually were similar or influenced by both their own militia traditions and those used by the regular United States Army.

Officers wore, according to regulations, a combination of several rank indicators on their uniform. The primary insignia was a number of bars or stars worn on the collar of the uniform coat or tunic. This was occasionally substituted for, or coupled with, shoulder straps. The secondary insignia were Austrian knots, elaborate patterns sewed on the lower sleeves with the number of lines indicating the rank. In 1862 those were ordered not be worn on the field uniform and thus mostly relegated to parade dress. In addition the regulation Kepi had a similar knot pattern on sides and top but other hats without insignia were frequently worn.

Most junior officers wore tunics and coats with a single row of seven buttons while field officers wore two rows, however there were exceptions. Generals could be recognized by the eagles on their buttons and the placement of the buttons in groups of two. While there was no official insignia distinction for different grades of general, all wearing three stars in a wreath on the collar, some major generals adopted the pattern of their Union counterparts by wearing two rows of nine buttons in groups of three.

Non-commissioned officers
Ranks were worn as chevrons on the right and left sleeves above the elbow. They were colored according to service branch:

 Infantry = Blue 
 Artillery = Red 
 Cavalry = Yellow
 Engineers = Yellow (or Gold)
 Ordnance = Crimson
 Militia = Black (or Grey) 

Brass shoulder scales were worn on dress uniforms, with different features to signify enlisted ranks. Shoulder scales were not normally worn on service or fatigue uniforms. When in full dress and sometimes also in battle, sergeants in non-mounted service branches carried the M1840 NCO Sword suspending on a leather belt (except for hospital stewards who carried a special sword model). Additionally all ranks above Sergeant (i.e. First Sergeant, Ordnance Sergeant, Hospital Steward, Sergeant Major etc.) wore crimson worsted waist sashes (in the Confederate States Army, all sergeant ranks wore swords and worsted waist sashes: red for artillery and infantry, yellow for cavalry).

Confederate States Navy (CSN)

Officers
Officers of the Confederate States Navy used, just like the army, a combination of several rank insignias to indicate their rank. While both hat insignia and sleeve insignia were used here the primary indicator were shoulder straps. Only line officers wore those straps shown below as officers of various staff departments (Medical, Pay, Engineering and Naval Construction) had separate ranks and different straps. Likewise the anchor symbol on the hats was substituted accordingly and they did not wear loops on the sleeve insignias.

Enlisted

Confederate States Marine Corps (CSMC)
The small Confederate States Marine Corps utilized insignia almost identical to that of the army with the major difference being changes in color or facing direction of chevrons.

Officers

Non-commissioned officers

See also
Uniforms of the Confederate States Armed Forces

References

External links
Confederate States Army rank insignia
Confederate States Marine Corps rank insignia

Military of the Confederate States of America
CSA